Blaster is the first-person rail shooter video game, released for arcades by Williams Electronics in 1983. It was developed by Eugene Jarvis and Larry DeMar. A vague sequel to Robotron: 2084, the game is a shoot 'em up set in outer space. The goal is to destroy enemies, avoid obstacles, and rescue astronauts in twenty levels to reach paradise.

The game uses large, scaled sprites to give the impression of attackers and asteroids approaching the player's ship. It was originally written for the Atari 8-bit family–something not made public until 2004. Neither the Atari 8-bit nor the arcade machine has bitmap scaling hardware; the Atari CPU has a higher clock rate.

Blaster was sold in both Duramold and, much less commonly, traditional wooden cabinets.

Plot
According to the opening demo: 

This implies, that the game takes place after the events of Robotron: 2084. However, aside from a few oversized G.R.U.N.T. robots in the first stage, none of the Robotron characters make an appearance in Blaster.

Gameplay

The game is controlled  with an optical joystick and two buttons: fire and thrust. The ship's weapon fires from a linear bank of four pyramid-shaped shots. Shots do not emanate toward the exact center of the screen; the first shot in the series will be furthest left, while the fourth will be furthest right. The Blastership is given three lives and extra lives are awarded every 100,000 points. The player has a life bar, in likeness to similar games such as Star Fox; however, in this implementation, the life bar represents three hit points, and not a continuum of health points. When the ship gets hit a second time the text "ENERGY CRITICAL" will be flashed on-screen. Almost everything in the game can be destroyed, from the asteroids to enemy shots. In fact the latter is a critical component of surviving for an extended period of time.

Marooned astronauts can be rescued by interception through the various waves. They are initially worth 1000 points, and are incremented by 200 points for each subsequent rescue during the same life, for a maximum value of 2000 points. Any situation where enemies appear in groups offer additional bonuses for destroying all enemies in the group. In some levels, such as the Saucerland waves, there are conditions which necessitate a certain order for the ships to be destroyed in. In most of the levels a large blue "E" decorated with arcs of lightning can be found. Shooting these E's will completely fill the shields, while colliding with them will cause the player to warp to the next wave. Before warping, every object in the level will turn into E's and the ship will speed against a backdrop of a field of E with Enegizers.

Development
Blaster was originally programmed by Vid Kidz for the Atari 8-bit family and the Atari 5200 console, and then converted to the arcade version. It was the third and last release by Vid Kidz.  The Atari versions were eventually scrubbed during the corporate shuffling that occurred after the video game crash of 1983, although they were finally found and released to the public in 2004.

The Motorola 6809 of the arcade machine runs at only 1 MHz, "and man did it hurt", says Jarvis.

Only three cockpit (sit-down) machines were ever produced. One is on display in Palo Alto, California in the home of Jarvis's father and the second was converted into a machine for Devastator, a prototype game that was never released. According to Jarvis, there have been unconfirmed sightings of the third.

Reception

Gene Lewin of Play Meter magazine reviewed the arcade game in 1983, scoring it 3 out of 10 as a dedicated arcade cabinet, but would raise it to 8 out of 10 if released as a conversion kit. The review called it "a space shoot-'em-up with good graphics and sound effects."

Legacy
Blaster was one of the video games on the television game show Starcade.

The game was first made available as a part of the Midway Classics Volume II. It is available on the PlayStation 2, GameCube, IBM PC, and Xbox as part of Midway Arcade Treasures and also included in Arcade's Greatest Hits: The Midway Collection 2

See also
Buck Rogers: Planet of Zoom (1982), third-person rail shooter with sprite scaling
Space Harrier (1985), relies on sprite scaling hardware for the visuals

References

External links
Blaster at Arcade History

Upright and cockpit cabinets

1983 video games
Arcade video games
Cancelled Atari 5200 games
Cancelled Atari 8-bit family games
Shoot 'em ups
Williams video games
Multiplayer and single-player video games
Video games developed in the United States
Video game sequels
Video games set in the 2080s